Chris Gall (born 11 July 1975 in Bad Aibling, Germany) is a German jazz pianist and composer.

Biography 
Gall studied classical piano at the Berklee College of Music in Boston, USA. In 1998 he finished jazz studies there. He released the album Piano Solo in 2015.

Gall was a regular member of the band of Giana Viscardi, with whom he performed at the 2001 Montreux Jazz Festival. He also played piano with the Indian fusion band Taalsim featuring Shakir Khan (sitar) and Kai Eckhardt (bass guitar). He also appeared with the New York Voices (Grammy Award winner) as well as with Chico César, Dusko Goykovich, Don Menza and Bobby Shew.

Gall, who also plays pop and world music, was signed to ACT in 2007, where he released the album Climbing Up with electro-pop artist Enik. He is also a part of the jazz-soul band The Hi-Fly Orchestra, with whom he performed internationally. In duo with the guitarist Andreas Dombert, he releaseded the album Duo (Acoustic Music). At the beginning of 2014, he traveled to Argentina as a guest musician with the band Quadro Nuevo and also participated as pianist, composer, and arranger on the band's album Tango! He can also be heard on albums by Norbert Küppers Riovolt and Mariette Radtke.

Discography (in selection)

Solo albums 
 1999: Vibes of Boston (HoHe-Musik), with Christian Gall Trio
 2008: Climbing Up (ACT), with Chris Gall Trio (Marcel Krömker, Peter Gall) feat. Enik
 2010: Hello Stranger (ACT), with Chris Gall Trio (Axel Kühn, Peter Gall) feat. Enik
 2014: Duo (Acoustic Music Records), duo with Andreas Dombert
 2015: Piano Solo (GLM Music)
 2017: Studio Konzert (Neuklang), duo with Bernhard Schimpelsberger
 2018: Cosmic Playground (Edition Collage), with Chris Gall Trio

Collaborations 
 2006: Metamorphosis (Altrisuoni), with Rafael Baier Group
 2007: Circle of Taals (Quinton), with Taalis
 2008: Mambo Atomico (Tramp Records), with The Hi-Fly Orchestra
 2009: Solitude (Double Moon), with Metamorphosis feat. Ingrid Lukas
 2012: Self-fulfilling Prophecies (GLM music), with Ecco DiLorenzo Jazz Quartet
 2013: Get Ready (Agogo Records), with The Hi-Fly Orchestra

References

External links 
 
 Entrance (GLM)
 

1975 births
21st-century pianists
Berklee College of Music alumni
German jazz pianists
German jazz composers
Living people